Anisyl sulfanyl methyl isocyanide (Asmic) is an organic molecule that contains an isocyanide group and an ortho-methoxy-phenyl sulfide group. Asmic can be used to synthesize tri-substituted isocyanides. Asmic is a colorless to off-white solid with a melting point of 27 °C that can be prepared by dehydration of the corresponding formamide by POCl3.

Asmic can be deprotonated at the position adjacent to the isocyanide by various organic bases. The anionic form of Asmic, which is stable at low temperatures, can be alkylated with a variety of electrophiles. Two sequential deprotonation-alkylation reactions and a subsequent sulfur-lithium exchange reaction allow the synthesis of tri-substituted isocyanides.

The ortho-methoxy-phenyl sulfide group is thought to facilitate deprotonation by chelating to metalated bases allowing for the base to achieve optimal trajectory during the deprotonation.

Asmic can be used to prepare oxazoles by condensation reactions with esters. The ortho-methoxy-phenyl sulfide group can also undergo sulfur-lithium exchange, and likely proceeds via a 10-s-3 sulfuranide.

References 

Thioethers
Isocyanides